This is a list of gliders/sailplanes of the world, (this reference lists all gliders with references, where available) 
Note: Any aircraft can glide for a short time, but gliders are designed to glide for longer.

L

La Mouette 

(Hang gliders - Fontaine-lès-Dijon, France)
La Mouette Atlas
La Mouette Chronos
La Mouette Cosmos
La Mouette O2B
La Mouette Profil
La Mouette Revo
La Mouette Samson
La Mouette Skybike
La Mouette Sphinx
La Mouette Top Model
La Mouette Topless
La Mouette Top Secret

L.A.D.
(Light Aircraft Development Co.)
 L.A.D. Mita 3 Kai 1
 L.A.D. SS-2

Laffont-Mouillard-Cousin
 Laffont-Mouillard-Cousin 1915 glider

Lagasse 
(Jean-René Lagasse)
 Lagasse 1901 glider
 Lagasse Cruiser
 Lagasse Éole A
 Lagasse Éole B
 Lagasse R-4
 Lagasse R-9
 Lagasse Simplex
 Lagasse Sulky
 Lagasse Sulky-Biplace

Laister
( Jack W. Laister / Laister-Kauffmann)
 Laister Yankee Doodle
 Laister Yankee Doodle 2
 Laister LP-15 Nugget
 Laister LP-46
 Laister LP-49
 Laister Universal 2-Place
 Laister-Kauffmann LK-10
 Laister-Kauffman TG-4
 Laister-Kauffman XCG-10 (Original design – completely different from later XCG-10A)
 Laister-Kauffman XCG-10A Trojan Horse

LAK 
(LAK – Lietuviška Aviacinė Konstrukcija / (some production by ESAG – Eksperimentine Sportines Aviacijos Gamykla)
 LAK-2
 LAK-5 Nemunas (motor glider)
 LAK-8
 LAK-9
 LAK-10 Lietuva
 LAK-11 Nida
 LAK-12 Lietuva
 LAK-12 Lietuva 2R
 LAK-14 Strazdas
 LAK-15
 LAK-16
 LAK-17
 LAK-19
 LAK-20
 Sportinë Aviacija SL-2P (aka Kensgaila VK-7)
 LAK Genesis 2

Lampich
(Ãrpád Lampich / Gyõr Soaring Club, Gyõr)
 Gyõr-2 (Ã. Lampich)
 Lampich LS-16

Lamson
(Phil Lamson)
 Lamson PL-1 Quark

Lamson
(Robert Lamson)
 Lamson L-106 Alcor

Landmann
(Hermann Landmann – Institut für Flugzeugkonstruktion der Technischen Hochschule Dresden)
 Landmann Jupp
 Landmann La-03
 Landmann La-06
 Landmann LA-16 V-1 Lerche
 Landmann LA-16 V-2 Heidelerche
 Landmann LA-17
 Krüger Schlägel und Eisen – Hermann Landmann & Nowack

Landes-Derouin
(Landes Frères & Derouin - Robert Landes, Théo Landes and Derouin / Louis Bréguet)
 Landes-Derouin
 Landes Oiseau Bleu
 Landes-Bréguet Mouette

Lange
 Lange Antares 20E
 Lange Antares 18S/T
 Lange Antares 23E

Langhammer
(Egon Scheibe / Bitz-Linner-Zoller)
 Langhammer L-10 Libelle

Langley
(Ernest Langley)
 Langley Sailplane

Larson
 Larson Utility

Latimer-Needham
(C. H. Latimer-Needham /  R.F.D. Co, Guilford)
 Latimer-Needham Albatross

Latvian Aero Club Olaine
 Vanadzins

Laubenthal 
(Paul Laubenthal)
Laubenthal Musterle
Laubenthal Lore
Laubenthal Württemberg

Lauk
(Peep Lauk – Estonia)
 Lauk Flying Wing – Estonia – Lauk, Peep

Launics
(Fricis Launics / 48th Glider Aviator Group, Krustpils (LU))
 Launics Krustpilietis

Lawrence
(L.W. Lawrence)
 Lawrence Water Glider

Lazarov
(Tzvetan Lazarov / DAR (Darzhavna Aeroplanna Rabotilnica) - Bozurishte, Bulgaria)
 Lazarov Polkovnik Drangov (Лазаров Дрангов)

LCF
(Luftsport-Club Friedrichshafen)
 LCF-II

le Bris
(Jean-Marie le Bris)
 le Bris Aéro-Voilier 
 le Bris Albatros
 le Bris La Barque Ailée

Lee-Richards
(Cedric Lee & G. Tilghman Richards / annular wing patent from G.J.A. Kitchen, Williband Franz Zelger and Isaac Henry Storey)
 Lee-Richards 1912 annular biplane glider

Leeming
(John Fishwick LEEMING, Clement WOOD & Tom PRINCE)
 Leeming LPW

Leffler-MacFarlane
(Al Leffler, Walt MacFarlane, Bill Meyer)
 Leffler-MacFarlane LM-1

Lefort
(Lucien Lefort)
 Lefort Triplan

Leonard
(Bob Leonard)
 Leonard Annebula

Leonard
(Whitmar Leonard / Leonard Motorless Aircraft, 32 Crescent Street, N.w., Grand Rapids, Michigan)
 Leonard LPT-1
 Leonard LPT-2

Leroy
(G. Leroy (Professeur Technique à l'École Professionelle d'Évreux)/ Aéroc-Club de l'Eure)
 Leroy MP-30-CV
 Leroy Motoplaneur

Lesh-Wulpi
(Lawrence J. Lesh & James M. Wulpi)
 Lesh 1907
 Lesh-Wulpi 1908 glider

Letov
 Letov Š-17
 Letov Š-22
 Letov LF-107 Luňák
 Letov XLF-207 Laminar
 Letov KB-9 – SLANOVEC, Marjan
 Letov LG-130 Kmotr
 Letov LD-60-5

Let Kunovice
 LET L-13 Blaník
 LET L-13AC Blanik 13.85m span-aerobatic
 LET L-13J Blanik motorglider
 LET L-21 Spartak - DLOUHI, K.
 LET L-22
 LET L-23 Super Blaník
 LET L-33 Solo - MECIAR, Marian & ZAJIC,V...
 Let LF-109 Pionýr
 Let VT-16 Orlik
 Let VT-116 Orlik II
 Let TG-10

LETOV 
(LETOV - Yugoslavia)
 LETOV Cavka
 LETOV Jastreb 54
 LETOV KB-1 Triglav I
 LETOV K2A Triglav II
 LETOV KB-2 Udarnik
 LETOV KB-3 Triglav III
 LETOV KB-5 Jadran
 LETOV KB-9
 LETOV KBI-14 Mačka
 LETOV (AK-ST-21) 21
 LETOV (AK-ST-22) 22
 LETOV Vrabac A

Leyat
(Marcel Leyat / Mr Audra / Association Française Aérienne)
 Leyat 1909 glider
 Leyat 1924 glider

LFG
(G. Baatz / Luftfahrzeug-Gesellschaft, Stralsund)
 LFG Boot-Phönix (LFG Phönix / LFG Phönix 3)

LIBIS 
(Letalski Institut "Branko Ivanus" Slovenia)
 LIBIS-17 – PRHAVC, Jože
 LIBIS 18
 LIBIS L-22
 Libis KB-17 Kondor
 Libis KB-18

Lightwing
(Lightwing Research / John M. Lee)
 Lightwing Type 4 Rooster
 Lightwing L6FS Mouse
 Lightwing CT6 Companion

Lilienthal
(Otto Lilienthal)
 Lilienthal 1890 glider
 Lilienthal 1893 glider
 Lilienthal 1896 glider
 Lilienthal Derwitzer Glider (1891)
 Lilienthal Normalsegelapparat (1894)
 Lilienthal Standard Doppeldecker Nr 13

Lindner 
(Fiberglas-Technik Rudolf Lindner)
 Lindner Phoebus B3

Lippisch
(Alexander Lippisch)
 Lippisch 1920 biplane glider
 Lippisch Zögling
 Lippisch Prüfling
 Lippisch Delta
 Lippisch Ente
 Lippisch Falke
 Lippisch Storch
 Lippisch Storch II
 Lippisch Storch III
 Lippisch Storch IV
 Lippisch Storch V
 Lippisch Storch VI
 Lippisch Storch VII
 Lippisch Storch VIII Marabu
 Lippisch Grüne Post
 Lippisch Professor
 Lippisch Wien
 Lippisch Fafnir
 Lippisch Urubu OBS
 Lippisch Fafnir 2 (São Paulo)
 Djävlar Anamma (Devil take it)

Liwentaal
(Alexandre Liwentaal)
 Liwentaal Aerostat – Alexandre Liwentaal

LO
(LO-Fluggerätebau)
 LO 120S

Loessl (Eugen)
(Eugen von Loessl - killed on the Wasserkuppe on 9 August 1920 flying the E.v.L.1)
 Lössl E.v.L.1

Loessl (Ernst)
(Ernst von Loessl - cousin of Eugen von Loessl)
 Loessl Sb.1 Münchener
 Loessl Sb.2
 Loessl Sb.3

Lohner
(Lohner Flugzeugbau)
 Lohner-Burchardt III (Wilhelm Burchardt)
 Lohner-Umlauff Rodelgleiter (Lohner & Hans von Umlauff)
 Lohner Kress (Leopold Bauer)

Loitron-Delage
(Loitron & Delage)
 Loitron-Delage 1909 glider

Lombarda 
(Aeronautica Lombarda / Camillo Silva)
 Lombarda AL-3 / Silva AL-3
 Lombarda GP.1 Pinguino / Pinguino GP.1 (GP – Maurizio Garbell & Ermenegildo Preti)
 Lombarda GP.2 Asiago / Asiago GP.2
 Lombarda AL-12P
 Lombarda A.R.
 Lombarda Assalto Radioguidato

Lommatzsch
(VEB Apparatebau Lommarzsch, Raubaaerstr. 4, Lommatzsch/Sa. (DDR))
 Lommatzsch FES-530 Lehrmeister
 Lommatzsch Lom-55 I Libelle – Heinz Roessing & Landemann
 Lommatzsch Lom-57 Libelle
 Lommatzsch Lom-58 I Libelle Standard
 Lommatzsch Lom-58 II Libelle Laminar
 Lommatzsch Lom-59 Lo-Meise
 Lommatzsch Lom-61 Favorit

L.O.P.P.
(L.O.P.P. – Liga Obrony Powietrznej i Przeciwgazowej – League of Air and Anti-gas Defence / Icarus)
 L.O.P.P. Poznan Ikar

Loravia
 Loravia KV-1 
 Loravia KV-2 
 Loravia KV-3A 
 Loravia KV-4 
 Loravia LCA-10 Topaze 
 Loravia LCA-11 Topaze

Lössl 
(Ernst von Lössl)
 Lössl SB-1 Münchener Eindecker
 Lössl SB-2
 Lössl SB-3
 Lössl E.v.L.1
 Lössl 1920 Wasserkuppe Glider

Lowe-Wylde
(Charles H. Lowe-Wylde)
 Lowe-Wylde Columbus

Loyko Tandem L-1
(LOYKO & Soc. Aviakim (USSR))
 Loyko Tandem L-1

Lucas
(Émile Lucas / Avions Émile Lucas)
 Lucas L-6A

Luków School
 Luków School Glider

Lunds Tekniske
 Lunds Tekniske Silhiuette

Lünger-Kohler
(Hans Lünger & Josef Kohler)
 Lünger-Kohler Beta 1

Lush
(Vladimir S. Lush)
 Lush Swift

Lüty
(Paul Lüty / Sportflugzeugbau, Hülserstrasse 398, Krefeld)
 Luty Ly-542 K Stösser

Lutz
(Werner Lutz)
 Lutz Welu-48

LWL
(Lwowskie Warsztaty Lotnicze – Lwów Aviation Workshops)
 P.W.S.101
 P.W.S.102 Rekin (Shark)
 P.W.S.103

Lwowskich Uczniów
(Kazimierz Baszniak, Wlodzimierz Siemiuła & Aleksander Sokalski)
 Lwowskich Uczniów 1910 glider

Lyushin Maori
(S. N. Lyushin)
 Lyushin Maori – S. N. Lyushin

Notes

Further reading

External links

Lists of glider aircraft